Outside Music is a Canadian record label and distributor founded by Lloyd Nishimura in 2001. In 2007, it expanded to include an artist management division which includes Jill Barber, Matthew Barber, Aidan Knight, Justin Rutledge as management clients.

The Outside Music Label released The Sadies's Tremendous Efforts and albums by Billy Bragg, Tinariwen, The Super Friendz, and the soundtrack to the indie film The Life and Hard Times of Guy Terrifico.

In 2010, The Sadies's Darker Circles and The Besnard Lakes's The Besnard Lakes Are the Roaring Night appeared on the Polaris Music Prize shortlist while in 2011, Little Scream's The Golden Record, Sloan's The Double Cross, Black Mountain's Wilderness Heart and One Hundred Dollars's Songs of Man all garnered Polaris long list nominations. Matthew Barber, Jill Barber, Oh Susanna, The Sadies, and The Hylozoists have all received Juno Award nominations for albums released on the Outside Music Label.

On December 1, 2018, Outside Music and Distribution Select merged their sales and distribution services, while maintaining their respective offices.

Notable mentions and awards

2007 Jill Barber won Female Artist of the Year as well as Best Album of the Year for For All Time at the East Coast Music Awards. She also received nominations for Folk Recording of the Year and Songwriter of the Year for the song "Don't Go Easy"
2008 Jill Barber was nominated for New Artist of the Year and her album For All Time; nominated in the solo category for Roots and Traditional Album at the Junos.
2008 The Sadies were nominated for a Juno Award for Best Roots/Traditional Band for the album New Seasons.
2009 Matthew Barber received Juno nomination for the record "Ghost Notes" in the Roots & Traditional Album Of the Year: Solo category.
2009 Jill Barber's Chances long listed for a Polaris Music Prize.
2009 Jill Barber won two East Coast Music Awards for her album Chances; Jazz Recording of the Year and Female Solo Recording of the Year.
2009 Sebastien Grainger & The Mountains was nominated for Indie Video of the Year category at the Much Music Video Awards for "Who Do We Care For?"
2010 Tinariwen's album Imidiwan: Companions: Companions took the prize for best album in the 2010 Uncut Music Award.
2010 Tinariwen performed for the Vancouver 2010 Olympics at the Orpheum in Vancouver.
2010 The Besnard Lakes nominated for the SOCAN ECHO Prize for songwriting.
2010 The Sadies appeared on the Junos telecast in a tribute to The Band alongside longtime collaborator and The band co-founder Garth Hudson.
2011 The Sadies's album Darker Circles was nominated for Best Album and they took home the Folk/Roots Group of the Year award at the Canadian Music Fest Indies. Additionally Black Mountain was nominated in the Best Rock Album category for Wilderness Heart.
2011 Polaris Music Prize Long List nominees included label roster artists Black Mountain - Wilderness Heart, Little Scream - The Golden Record, One Hundred Dollars - Songs of Man, Sloan - The Double Cross.
2011 Matthew Barber's song "Where the River Bends" was used by Hockey Night in Canada in a video honouring the NHL players who had died in the summer.
2012 Sloan's album "The Double Cross" was nominated for a Juno Award for Rock Album of the Year.
2013 Rose Cousins's album We Have Made a Spark won the Juno Award for Roots & Traditional Album of the Year, Solo
2013 Justin Rutledge's album Valleyheart won the Canadian Folk Music Award for Contemporary Album of The Year
2014 Justin Rutledge's album Valleyheart won the Juno Award for Roots & Traditional Album of The Year, Solo
2015 Jenn Grant's album Compostela was nominated for Adult Alternative Album of the Year and Best Songwriter of the Year at Juno Awards.

Roster
 Jill Barber
 Matthew Barber
 The Besnard Lakes
 Rose Cousins
 Evening Hymns
 Folly and the Hunter
 Jenn Grant
 The Hidden Cameras
 Aidan Knight
 Tami Neilson
 Justin Rutledge
 Snowblink
 The Weather Station

Past roster
 Baby Eagle
 King Cobb Steelie
 Blood Meridian
 Sebastien Grainger
 Dog Day
 Woolly Leaves
 Tinariwen
 Rebekah Higgs
 Rock Plaza Central
 Billy Bragg
 The Weekend
 The Wailin' Jennys
 Little Scream
 Black Mountain
 Sloan

Labels distributed through Outside

 604 Records (vinyl only)
 ACT Music
 Aporia Records
 Asthmatic Kitty
 Awesome Tapes from Africa
 anticon
 Ba Da Bing!
 Barsuk
 Bella Union
 Big Dada
 Blue Corn Music
 Bongo Beat
 Boompa Records
 Burger Records
 Butterscotch Records
 Canyon Records
 Cellar Live
 Chronograph Records
 Constellation
 The Control Group
 Cornerstone Records
 Crammed Discs
 Dead Daisy Records
 Do Right! Music
 Domino Recording Company
 Electro-Fi Records
 Fat Cat Records
 Fat Possum Records
 File Under: Music
 Flemish Eye
 Hardly Art
 Indica Records
 Jazz Cellar Café
 Kelp Records
 Kill Rock Stars
 Light in the Attic
 Metropolis Records
 Milagro
 Mint Records
 Mom+Pop
 Ninja Tune
 NorthernBlues Music
 Paper Bag Records
 Red House Records
 S.P.A.C.E
 Sacred Bones
 Saddle Creek Records
 Saved by Radio
 Six Degrees
 Songlines
 Soul Jazz
 Standard Form
 Sub Pop
 Thirsty Ear
 Unicorn Digital
 Valley Entertainment
 Vinyl Cafe
 White Swan Records
 White Whale Records
 Wichita Recordings
 Windham Hill
 weewerk
 Yep Roc
 You've Changed Records
 Zunior

See also
 List of record labels

References

External links
 Official site

Alternative rock record labels
Indie rock record labels
Canadian independent record labels
Record label distributors
Record labels established in 1995